Ángel Herrera may refer to:

Ángel Herrera Oria (1886–1968), Spanish journalist, politician, Catholic lay leader and later priest, bishop and cardinal
Ángel Herrera Vera (born 1957), Cuban boxer
Ángel Aguirre Herrera (born 1984), Mexican PRD politician
Ángel Maria Herrera (1859–1948), Panamanian educator

See also
Ángel Herrero (disambiguation)